Educational anthropology, or the anthropology of education, is a sub-field of anthropology and is widely associated with the pioneering work of Margaret Mead and later, George Spindler, Solon Kimball, and Dell Hymes, and Jean Lave.  It gained attraction as a field of study during the 1970s, particularly due to professors at Teachers College, Columbia University.  As the name would suggest, the focus of educational anthropology is on education, although an anthropological approach to education tends to focus on the cultural aspects of education, including informal as well as formal education.

Some of the earliest texts that argued for and illustrated the usefulness of anthropology applied to formal educational settings were Education and Anthropology (1955), edited by George Spindler, and Anthropological Perspectives on Education (1971), co-edited by Murray L. Wax,  Stanley Diamond, and Fred O. Gearing.

Educational anthropologists try to focus on education and multiculturalism, educational pluralism, culturally relevant pedagogy and native methods of learning and socializing. Educational anthropologists are also interested in the education of marginal and peripheral communities within large nation states. It is more of an applied field as the focus of educational anthropology is on improving teaching learning process in a culturally plural context. Educational Anthropology becomes more relevant with the advent of globalization, we now have classrooms which are a melting pots of different cultures.

As education involves understandings of who we are, it is not surprising that the single most recognized dictum of educational anthropology is that the field is centrally concerned with cultural transmission.  Cultural transmission involves the transfer of a sense of identity between generations, sometimes known as enculturation and also transfer of identity between cultures, sometimes known as acculturation. Accordingly, it is also not surprising that educational anthropology has become increasingly focused on ethnic identity and ethnic change.

Journals 
Some of the main journals in the field include:

 Anthropology & Education Quarterly
 Education & Culture
 Ethnography and Education Journal
 Pedagogy, Culture, and Society

References

Anthropology
Comparative education